Addi or variation, may refer to:

Places
 Addi a geographic term
 Addi, Punjab, India; a village

People
Surnamed
 Goggo Addi (1911–1999), a Cameroonian storyteller
 Nour Imane Addi, a Moroccan soccer player

Given named
 Addi I, emir of the Emirate of Trarza
 Addi II, emir of the Emirate of Trarza
 Addi, a bishop of the Bishopric of Edessa
 Addi, a figure in the Old Testament
 Addi Bâ (1916–1943), a Senegalese-French WWII resistance fighter
 Addi Glunz (1916–2002), WWII German fighter ace
 Addi Somekh (born 1972), a U.S. balloon artist

Other uses
 Alliance of Democrats for Integral Development, Togolese political party
 "Addi" (song), 1971 song by Duke Ellington off the album Togo Brava Suite

See also

 Addis (disambiguation)
 Adi (disambiguation)